Brendan Michael Hamill (born 18 September 1992) is an Australian professional footballer who plays as a defender for Indian Super League club ATK Mohun Bagan.

Club career
Hamill played for the Australian Institute of Sport in the 2009–10 A-League National Youth League where they failed to win a single game. Hamill was selected for the 'Come Play XI' which was thrown together in order to play a friendly against Melbourne Victory as a testimonial game for Kevin Muscat.

Melbourne Heart
On 23 April 2010 Hamill rejected numerous offers from English Premier League clubs to sign his first professional contract with Melbourne Heart along with fellow U-20 players, Kliment Taseski and Eli Babalj. On 5 August 2010, he became the youngest player to play for Heart, at 17 years and 321 days old.

Seongnam Ilhwa Chunma
On 16 July 2012, Hamill joined K-League side Seongnam.

Western Sydney Wanderers
On 26 June 2014, Hamill signed for Western Sydney Wanderers.

Western United
On 15 May 2019, after rejecting a contract extension from Western Sydney Wanderers, Hamill signed for new A-League club Western United.

Melbourne Victory
In July 2021, after playing 20 games over two seasons with Western United, Hamill re-united with coach Tony Popovic, joining Melbourne Victory on a two-year deal.

ATK Mohun Bagan
On 23 June 2022, Indian Super League club ATK Mohun Bagan announce the signing of Brendan Hamill on a two-year deal. He made his debut for the club as substitute on 20 August against Rajasthan United at the 131st edition of Durand Cup; his team lost the match by 3–2.

International career
In 2009 Hamill was called up to the Australian U-20 squad for the 2010 AFC U-19 Championship qualification as a replacement for the injured Trent Sainsbury.

On 7 March 2011 he was selected to represent the Australia Olympic football team in an Asian Olympic Qualifier match against Iraq.

Career statistics

Honours
Western Sydney Wanderers
 AFC Champions League: 2014

Melbourne Victory
FFA Cup: 2021Australia U16 AFF U-16 Youth Championship: 2008Australia U19'''
 AFF U-19 Youth Championship: 2010

References

External links
 

1992 births
Living people
Australian expatriate soccer players
Australia international soccer players
Melbourne City FC players
Seongnam FC players
Gangwon FC players
A-League Men players
K League 1 players
K League 2 players
Expatriate footballers in South Korea
Australian expatriate sportspeople in South Korea
Australian Institute of Sport soccer players
Western Sydney Wanderers FC players
Western United FC players
Melbourne Victory FC players
ATK Mohun Bagan FC players
Soccer players from Sydney
Association football defenders
Australian soccer players
Australian expatriate sportspeople in India
Expatriate footballers in India
Indian Super League players